Namida No Kiseki is the 3rd studio album by , released on 12 March 2008. The album contains 3 songs from past singles, 8 new songs, and 1 unlisted hidden track "" with lyrics penned by Nonaka herself. It reached the 62nd place on the Oricon Weekly Albums Chart.

Track listing
CACAO85

Maybe?

NO DREAM X NO LIFE

(BONUS TRACK)

DVD (PV CLIPS) (Initial Limited Edition Only)

References

Official Discography of Ai Nonaka

2008 albums
Ai Nonaka albums